Jean-Philippe Andaman Koffi (born May 18, 1985), is an Ivorian professional basketball player.  He currently plays for the Pays des Olonnes Basket club of the French NM2 league.

He represented Ivory Coast's national basketball team on many occasions. At the 2015 AfroBasket he was the whole tournament's best free shooter.

References

External links
 Eurobasket.com Profile
 2015 AfroBasket Profile
 video jean philippe koffi.wmv Youtube.com Video

1985 births
Living people
Ivorian men's basketball players
Sportspeople from Abidjan
Point guards
Shooting guards